Steep may refer to:

Arts and entertainment
 Steep (2007 film), a film about extreme skiing
 Steep (video game), a 2016 video game

Places

England
 Steep, Hampshire, a village in central Hampshire, England
 Steep Hill, a popular tourist street in the historic city of Lincoln, Lincolnshire, England
 Steep Holm, an English island lying in the Bristol Channel

Other places
 Steep Island, Australia
 Steep Island, Hong Kong
 Steep Point, westernmost point of the Australian mainland
 Mount Steep, Antarctica

Science, technology, and mathematics
 Slope, an elementary mathematical concept
 Grade (slope), in civil engineering

People with the surname
 Frederick Steep (1874–1956), Canadian amateur football (soccer) player

Other uses
 Steeping, a cooking technique employing soaking
 STEEP analysis, a variant of the PEST analysis business analysis framework